Wacousta is an unincorporated community and census-designated place (CDP) in Clinton County in the U.S. state of Michigan.  The CDP is located within Watertown Charter Township.  As of the 2010 census, it had a population of 1,440.

History
The community of Wacousta was listed as a newly-organized census-designated place for the 2010 census, meaning it now has officially defined boundaries and population statistics for the first time.

Geography

The Looking Glass River flows from east to west across the CDP.

Demographics

References 

Unincorporated communities in Clinton County, Michigan
Lansing–East Lansing metropolitan area
Unincorporated communities in Michigan
Census-designated places in Clinton County, Michigan
Census-designated places in Michigan